"Turn the Lights On" is the third single released from Big Sugar's 1998 album, Heated. The song was successful in Canada, peaking at No. 8 on the RPM Rock chart. It is one of the band's signature songs.

References

1999 singles
Big Sugar songs
1998 songs
A&M Records singles
Songs written by Gordie Johnson